Housing Bureau (HB) is one of the fifteen policy bureaux for the Government of Hong Kong. It is responsible for the housing portfolios. The agency was established on 1 July 2022. The current (since 1 July 2022) Secretary for Housing is Winnie Ho.

This bureau was newly established under the re-organization of policy bureaux proposed by Carrie Lam, the fifth Chief Executive of Hong Kong, and was adopted by John Lee, the succeeding Chief Executive after Carrie Lam. On 19 June 2022, the Central People's Government announced the appointment of Winnie Ho, previously the Director of Architectural Services, as the first Secretary for Housing.

Subordinate departments 
There is only one department managed by the bureau:
Housing Department

References

External links

Hong Kong government policy bureaux